KKJD-LP (99.1 FM) was a radio station licensed to Borrego Springs, California, United States. The station was owned by Borrego Springs Christian Center.

The station's license was returned to the Federal Communications Commission (FCC) by the licensee on July 12, 2013, and the license was cancelled by the FCC that day.

References

External links
 

KJD-LP
KJD-LP
Defunct radio stations in the United States
Radio stations disestablished in 2013
Defunct religious radio stations in the United States
2013 disestablishments in California
KJD-LP